Philip Williams (7 September 1824 – 18 November 1899) was an English cleric and cricketer.

He was educated at Winchester College, where he played cricket for the school 1840–42, and New College, Oxford, matriculating in 1841. There he played for the University 1844–47 and also played for Nottinghamshire in 1845.

Williams was a Fellow of New College from 1844 to 1851, when he graduated B.C.L. He was called to the bar at Lincoln's inn the same year, but did not practise as a barrister. He instead became a Church of England priest. He was rector of Rewe, Devon, 1860–92.

References

1824 births
1899 deaths
English cricketers
Nottinghamshire cricketers
People from Eton, Berkshire
Oxford University cricketers
Marylebone Cricket Club cricketers
North v South cricketers
Gentlemen of Nottinghamshire cricketers
People educated at Winchester College
Alumni of New College, Oxford
19th-century English Anglican priests
Gentlemen of Southwell cricketers
Fast v Slow cricketers